Wendy Lee Brown  (née Urquhart, born 21 November 1950) is a former New Zealand sprinter. She represented her country at the 1974 and 1978 Commonwealth Games, Brown was selected for the 1982 Commonwealth Games, but withdrew from team due to injury.
Brown was the New Zealand recordholder over 100 and 200 metres between 1974 and 1985. She won six New Zealand national sprinting titles between 1971 and 1981.

Early life and family
Brown was born Wendy Lee Urquhart in New Plymouth on 21 November 1950, and was educated at New Plymouth Girls' High School. She then studied at Palmerston North Teachers' College, where she completed a Diploma of Teaching in 1970, and became a schoolteacher.

In 1971, she married Ian Brown, and the couple had two children.

Athletics
Brown won the New Zealand national women's 100 m title four times, in 1971, 1973, 1974, and 1981; and the 200 m championship twice, in 1973 and 1981. , her times in winning the 100 m and 200 m titles in 1981, 11.40 s and 23.06 s, respectively, remain championship records. She broke the New Zealand 100 metres and 200 metres national records in 1974, and held them both until 1985.

Brown represented New Zealand at the 1973 Pacific Conference Games in Toronto, winning the silver medal in the women's 100 metres. Four years later, at the 1977 Pacific Conference Games, she won bronze in the same event.

At the 1974 British Commonwealth Games, Brown competed in the 100 m and 200 m sprints, and the 4 x 100 metres relay. In the 100 metres, she finished fifth in the final, posting a time of 11.59 seconds, while in the 200 metres, she recorded a time of 23.44 seconds in placing sixth. She was a member of the New Zealand quartet, with Brenda Matthews, Gail Wooten and Kim Robertson, that was fifth in the 4 x 100 metres relay with a time of 44.68 seconds.

Brown represented New Zealand in the same three events at the 1978 Commonwealth Games in Edmonton. Alongside Gail Wooten, Kim Robertson, and Penny Hunt, she was fourth in the final of the 4 x 100 m relay, in a time of 45.06 seconds. In the 100 metres, she recorded a time of 11.84 seconds in her heat and did not progress, while in the 200 metres she ran 23.64 seconds in her semifinal and did not qualify for the final.

In the 1983 New Year Honours, Brown was appointed a Member of the Order of the British Empire for services to athletics.

1997 World Masters Athletic Champs in Durban, South Africa, Brown won the W45 100m in 12.87, won the W45 200m in 26.56. Member of NZ W45 4 x 100m placed 2nd, W45 4x 400m, placed 3rd.

2001 World Masters Athletic Champs, Brisbane, Australia. Brown won the W50 100m in 13.22, won the W50 200m in 27.37. Member of NZ W50 4 x 100m, placed 3rd.<world-masters-athletics.comref></ref>

Other activities
Between 1986 and 1988, Brown was a member of the Rodney College Board of Governors, and from 1989 to 1991 she was the vice chair of the Rodney College Board of Trustees.

References

1950 births
Living people
Sportspeople from New Plymouth
People educated at New Plymouth Girls' High School
New Zealand female sprinters
Commonwealth Games competitors for New Zealand
Athletes (track and field) at the 1974 British Commonwealth Games
Athletes (track and field) at the 1978 Commonwealth Games
New Zealand Members of the Order of the British Empire